Ice All Stars is a figure skating show produced by IB sports and sponsored by Samsung Electronics. The show was headlined by former IB client Kim Yuna.

Ice All Stars 2009 was held in the Olympic Gymnastics Arena in Seoul, South Korea from August 14 to 16, 2009.

Ice All Stars 2009 was directed by Brian Orser, and choreographed by David Wilson.
The members of show are all Olympic champion or World Champion.

The cast for 2009

 Kim Yuna (2010 Olympic Gold medalist and 2-time World Champion)
 Michelle Kwan (2-time Olympic medalist (Silver and Bronze) and 5-time World Champion)
 Shae-Lynn Bourne (2003 World Champion)
 Shizuka Arakawa (2006 Olympic Gold medalist and 2004 World Champion) 
 Ilia Kulik (1998 Olympic Gold medalist)
 Stéphane Lambiel (2006 Olympic Silver medalist and 2-time World Champion)
 Adam Rippon (2-time World Junior Champion) 
 Shen Xue & Zhao Hongbo (2010 Olympic Gold medalists and 3-time World Champions)
 Aliona Savchenko & Robin Szolkowy (2010 Olympic Bronze medalists, 2-time World Champions)
 Albena Denkova & Maxim Staviski (2-time World Champions)

Programs

ACT 1

 OPENING - Fanfare for the Common Man / Pirates of the Caribbean OST
 Adam RIPPON - Jonathan Livingston Seagull by Neil Diamond
 Shae-Lynn BOURNE - La Cumparsita
 Xue SHEN & Hongbo ZHAO - Io ci Sarò by Andrea Bocelli
 Stephane LAMBIEL - The Four Seasons by Antonio Vivaldi
 Albena DENKOVA & Maxim STAVISKI - Libertango by Vasko Vasiliev
 Shizuka ARAKAWA - You Raise Me Up by Celtic Woman
 Aliona SAVCHENKO & Robin SZOLKOWY - Send in the Clowns by Stephen Sondheim
 Ilia KULIK - Song for the King by Michael W. Smith
 Yuna KIM - Danse Macabre by Camille Saint-Saëns
 Michelle KWAN - Carmina Burana (Mix Ver.) by Carl Orff
 CLOSING - Mondschein by Ludwig van Beethoven

ACT 2

 OPENING - Michael Jackson Mix
 Shae-Lynn BOURNE - All That Jazz
 Adam RIPPON - I'm Yours by Jason Mraz
 Albena DENKOVA & Maxim STAVISKI - Cry Me a River by Justin Timberlake
 Ilia KULIK - Deal with It by Corbin Blue
 Xue SHEN & Hongbo ZHAO - Ramalama(Bang Bang) by Roisin Murphy
 Stephane LAMBIEL - Ne Me Quitte Pas by Jacques Brel
Michelle KWAN - Winter Song by Sara Bareilles with Ingrid Michaelson
 Aliona SAVCHENKO & Robin SZOLKOWY - Fascination by Alphabeat
 Shizuka ARAKAWA  - Candyman by Christina Aguilera
 Yuna KIM - Don't Stop the Music by Rihanna
 DAVICHI (Special Guest) - 8282
 FINALE - We Are the Champions by Queen
 ENCORE - I Will Survive by Gloria Gaynor

Special guests
 Davichi - female singing group 
 Millenium symphony orchestra
 Seo Hee-Tae - conductor

References

External links
 Ice All Stars 2009 - Official site

Ice shows